Abids  is a major commercial center in Hyderabad, India. Abids is well known as the oldest and most famous business area in Hyderabad. The state government building (TSFC), and the President Plaza, Badshah palace are located here. A variety of businesses are located here, unlike most markets which are known for specializing in a certain trade. This area's importance has increased because of its close proximity to Nampally Railway Station.

It is surrounded by Basheerbagh to the north, Nampally to the east via Chapel Road, Koti to the west, and Chaderghat to the south, via the Bank Street. It falls under Nampally constituency.

History

The St. George's Grammar School (established in 1834), and adjoining St. George's Church  (established in 1844) predate the area's naming.

This area had a shop known as Abid's belonging to an Armenian merchant known as Albert Abid, a valet of Nizam VI of Hyderabad state, hence the area came to be known as Abids. Albert Abid left for England, but as per another version the area got its name after a shop run by Abid Evans.

Urban designers pass a statement saying, “Abids is dead” or “Abids is no more”. Though the activity in Abids has gone through a considerable decrease, it still holds its essence and has a wide scope for its revival.

In 1939, the store was demolished and a cinema known as "Palace Talkies" was built in its place. Later in the 1980s this theater was also demolished and a new structure built in its place. Now this space is occupied by Big Bazaar.

In 1942, the headquarters of the State Bank of Hyderabad were established here. The Taj Mahal Hotel was built here in the 1950s.

Commerce
Today the whole area is one of the main shopping centres in the city and the main street is known as Abids Road. The General Post Office or GPO headquarters is located in this area. The major businesses are hotels and shops for textiles, clothing, jewelry, footwear, and electronics. BSNL, the largest telecommunications provider in the city, has its headquarters located here. The GHMC office is also located here, situated adjacent to the GPO.

The famous Jagdish market, a bustling grey market for mobiles and electronics, is also located here.

The area is a major business hub and has many restaurants for travellers. Palace Heights, the Taj Mahal Hotel and Grand Hotel are the best restaurants in Abids.

Culture
Some famous temples are located here especially on the Nampally and Abids road, such as the Hanuman Temple and  ISKCON which are considered to be heritage sites.. The Centenary Methodist Church, Hyderabad, amongst the oldest churches in South India is located here.

Education
Many English medium schools are established in the area.

List of Schools
 Sujatha High School
 Stanley Girls High School
 St. George's Grammar School
 Little Flower High School
 Rosary Convent High School
 All Saints High School
 Nazareth High School
 Slate the School
 St. John's Grammar School
 Methodist Boys' High School

Transport
The Abids Road is an arterial road of the city, connecting parts of the old city to the new and also to Hyderabad's twin city, Secunderabad, via Tank Bund Road. Abids is well connected by TSRTC buses to Ghatkesar, Kothi, Nampally, Dilsukhnagar and other areas of the city.

The closest MMTS train station is located a kilometer away at the Nampally railway station. Other public modes of transport such as auto-rickshaws and taxis are found aplenty as they keep shuttling between this area and other areas of the city.

References

External links
 "Abids, the Heart of Hyderabadis" - The Hindu 7 October 2012 
 "Proud heritage of Abids in a state of neglect" - Postnoon 23 July 2012 

Neighbourhoods in Hyderabad, India
Shopping districts and streets in India